Antonius Suwanto, (born November 30, 1959) is an Indonesian biologist and professor, known for discovering two circular chromosomes or plasmids in Rhodobacter with Kaplan S in 1989. 

He was born in Jember, Indonesia. He received an award as cum laude from the Institut Pertanian Bogor, Indonesia. After that he received his master's degree from the University of Illinois. He is a faculty member in the Department of Biology, Institut Pertanian Bogor.

Publications

References

Indonesian biologists
Indonesian Christians
1959 births
Living people